NFU is a three-letter initialism which may stand for:

 National Farmers Union (disambiguation), in several countries
 National Film Unit, a New Zealand film production company
 National Formosa University, a university in Taiwan
 New Foundations with Urelements, an axiomatic set theory in mathematical logic
 North Ferriby United F.C., an English football team
 Nuclear No first use policy
 Nanjing Forestry University, a university in Nanjing, China